Methanocalculus is a genus of the Methanomicrobiales, and is known to include methanogens.

The genome of Methanocalculus is somewhat different from other genera of methanogenic archaea, with less than 90% 16S ribosomal RNA similarity. The species within Methanocalculus also have a greater tolerance to salt than other microorganisms, and they can live at salt concentrations as high as 125 g/L. Some species within Methanocalculus are neutrophiles, and Methanocalculus natronophilus, discovered in 2013, is a strict alkaliphile.

Nomenclature
The name "Methanocalculus" has Latin roots: "methano" for methane and "calculus" for gravel.  Overall, it means gravel-shaped organism that produces methane.

Phylogeny
The currently accepted taxonomy is based on the List of Prokaryotic names with Standing in Nomenclature (LPSN) and National Center for Biotechnology Information (NCBI).

See also
 List of Archaea genera

References

Further reading

Scientific journals

Scientific books

Scientific databases

External links 

Methanocalculus at BacDive -  the Bacterial Diversity Metadatabase

Archaea genera
Euryarchaeota